Alea Jacta Est (en: "The Die Is Cast") is the third studio album by the Asturian power metal band WarCry, released on January 1, 2004, (see 2004 in music and 2004 in heavy metal music) and distributed through Avispa.

Overview
Alea Jacta Est was mastered in the M-20 Studios in Madrid by Francisco Martínez, produced by Víctor and Alberto, and co-produced by Slaven Kolak. Esteban Casasolas mixed it in Jaus Records where was also edited, and the graphic design ran by Ricardo Menéndez. the first album to feature writing contributions from all the band members (excluding Ardines and Mon), turning all the music and lyrics more introspective.

The album was the last work by the band to include the bass guitarist Alvaro Jardón, who left after the last concert for El Sello De Los Tiempos tour at Sala Quattro in Avilés, leaving a communiqué on the band's website: "For personal and musical reasons, I have decided to leave WarCry. I would like to thank those who have supported me during these years and those who bought the discs in which I participated. I hope we meet again in future projects." The rest of the members said they respected his decision, and Alvaro's work on WarCry would always be a part of the band history.

Ttwelve days after its release, the album reached #3 in the Fnac's list of sales, competing with albums from all musical styles. It also had a great reception, with critics that have prized this work. A month later, Víctor García and Manuel Ramil won the prizes as best vocals and keyboard player respectively, in the Radial Awards, celebrated in Spain.

Alea Jacta Est Tour, the tour to support the album, started on March 5, 2004, and lasted more than seven months, playing with bands like DarkSun, Abyss and Transfer. On the first concert of the tour, WarCry made the official presentation of Jardón's replacement, Roberto García who had left Avalanch due to personal and professional problems with Alberto Rionda. He mainly played the guitar, but in order to become a member he decided to play bass guitar.

Track listing
All tracks composed by Víctor García, except where noted.
 "El Guardián de Troya"  ("The Guardian of Troy") – 6:06
 "Iberia"  ("Iberia") – 5:19
 "Despertar"  ("Awakening") (Pablo García) – 5:36
 "Lamento"  ("Cry") (Alvaro Jardón) – 4:57
 "Sin tu voz"  ("Without Your Voice") – 5:59
 "Aire"  ("Air") – 5:23
 "Junto a Mí"  ("Next to Me") (Music: Pablo, Manuel; Lyrics: Pablo García) – 4:47
 "Espíritu de Amor"  ("Spirit of Love") – 5:13
 "Fe"  ("Faith") (Manuel) – 7:13
 "Reflejos de Sangre"  ("Reflections of Blood") (Pablo, Manuel)  – 7:49

Personnel

Musicians
 Víctor García – vocals
 Manuel Ramil – keyboards
 Alvaro Jardón – bass guitar
 Fernando Mon – guitars
 Pablo García – guitars
 Alberto Ardines – drums

Production
 Carlos Rodríguez – photos
 Ricardo Menéndez – design
 Slaven Kolak – co-production
 Esteban Casasolas – mix
 Francisco Martínez – mastering

References

External links
 WarCry official website

WarCry (band) albums
2004 albums